Sinazongwe District is a district of Zambia, located in Southern Province. The capital lies at Sinazongwe. As of the 2010 Zambian Census, the district had a population of 101,617 people.

References

Districts of Southern Province, Zambia